The 2009 Crystal Skate of Romania was the 10th edition of an annual senior-level international figure skating competition held in Romania. It was held between November 27 and 29, 2009 in Galați. Skaters competed in the disciplines of men's singles and ladies' singles.

Results

Men

Ladies

External links
 results

Crystal Skate Of Romania, 2009